Hunter Gomez (born December 20, 1991) is an American former actor. He is most widely recognized for his work in films and guest appearances in American television.

Career
Gomez was born in Mesa, Arizona.  He began his entertainment career in 2003 at age 12. He has worked with actors including Nicolas Cage, Jon Voight, Christopher Plummer, Jessica Simpson, Jennifer Love Hewitt, James Belushi, Robert Picardo, Seth MacFarlane, Jodie Sweetin, David Henrie and most recently Sam Heughan.

Gomez got his start playing the younger version of Nicolas Cage's character Benjamin Franklin Gates in the 2004 Disney film National Treasure. Playing the younger version of famous actors became a career staple for Gomez. He portrayed the younger versions of Arnold Schwarzenegger, Justin Timberlake, Luke Wilson, Goose Gossage, and Hugh Harman in films and on television.

Gomez' recent films include Last Ounce of Courage, where he played the lead role as the grandson of a man grieving over his son's death. The movie was released in 2012. Gomez recently played Hugh Harman in Walt Before Mickey produced by Arthur L. Bernstein and Armando Gutierrez. In 2015, Gomez completed When the Starlight Ends starring Sam Heughan.  In 2018, he played Johnny Boy in The Little Mermaid, which marked his final film role before ending his acting career permanently without notice to focus on becoming a communications director for a major corporation.

His TV appearances include episodes of The Tonight Show with Jay Leno, According to Jim, Ned's Declassified School Survival Guide, The John Henson Project, The Nick and Jessica Variety Hour, The Suite Life of Zack & Cody and Ghost Whisperer. He voiced several characters on Family Guy.

Education
Gomez finished his undergraduate degree at Arizona State University in 2014.

He currently studies at the George Washington University in Washington, DC, where he also works as a political consultant.

Philanthropy
Gomez became known for his charity work. He founded the Gomez Family Food drive which raised over 130,000 pounds of food for local food banks. He sponsored two students through Compassion International.

For his 18th birthday, Gomez organized a soccer match called "The Children's Cup" that took place at the Scottsdale Sports Complex. All proceeds went to the charity HopeKids.

He was involved in politics both on a local and national level. In one of his first press conferences at the Capitol with Rick Schroder, Gomez spoke in hopes of getting a bill passed to offer incentives to film makers.

Family
Hunter is the youngest of 6 children. His parents Ernesto Gomez and Linda Gomez were "Arizona Parents of the Year" in 2006 and in 2007. They were honored as "National Parents of the Year" by the National Parents' Day Coalition.

References

External links

1991 births
Living people
American male child actors
Male actors from Arizona
People from Mesa, Arizona
American male voice actors
American male actors of Mexican descent
Arizona State University alumni